Selina Jörg (born 24 January 1988) is a German snowboarder.

She competed in the parallel giant slalom at the 2010 Vancouver Winter Olympics, finishing in fourth position. She subsequently won a bronze medal at the 2013 Winter Universiade in the same discipline.

References

External links

1988 births
Living people
German female snowboarders
Olympic snowboarders of Germany
Snowboarders at the 2010 Winter Olympics
Snowboarders at the 2014 Winter Olympics
Snowboarders at the 2018 Winter Olympics
Universiade medalists in snowboarding
Medalists at the 2018 Winter Olympics
Olympic silver medalists for Germany
Olympic medalists in snowboarding
People from Sonthofen
Sportspeople from Swabia (Bavaria)
Universiade silver medalists for Germany
Universiade bronze medalists for Germany
Competitors at the 2013 Winter Universiade
Competitors at the 2015 Winter Universiade
20th-century German women
21st-century German women